William Longden (born c. 1867) was an English footballer who played as an outside right and right half for Doncaster Rovers and Rotherham Town at the turn of the 19th century.

After Division 2 side Rotherham Town went out of business at the end of the 1895−86 season, Longden moved to play for nearby Doncaster in the Midland League. He began for Doncaster playing outside right, his debut being away to Mexborough Town on 5 September 1896, and his first goal three weeks later at home to Ilkeston Town. That season Doncaster were Champions of the Midland League, Longden scoring 7 of their 77 goals.

He became the Rover's regular penalty taker as well as captain. He moved to play at right half towards the end of his career.

After returning to Division 2 with Doncaster in the 1901−02 season, Longden retired from playing the game, his last match was in the 2–1 victory over Leicester Fosse in which he broke his arm in a collision twenty minutes into the game.

Honours
Midland League
Champions: 1896−97, 1898−99
Runner up: 1900−01

Yorkshire League
Runner up: 1898−99

References

English footballers
Association football forwards
Association football midfielders
Doncaster Rovers F.C. players
Rotherham Town F.C. (1878) players
English Football League players
Year of birth uncertain
Place of birth missing
Year of death missing
Midland Football League players